Cecco Bravo (15 November 1601 – 1661) was an Italian painter of the Florentine Baroque school. His true name is Francesco Montelatici.

Biography
He trained with Giovanni Biliverti and was also close to Sigismondo Coccapani. In the early 1620s he worked in the studio of Matteo Rosselli.

By 1629, he had his own independent studio. His first recorded work is a fresco of the Virgin, St John & Angels (c. 1628/9; San Marco, Florence) and a painting of Charity (Annunziata of Florence). In 1633, he painted six lunettes with scenes from the Life of the Blessed Bonaventura Bonaccorsi for the church of Santissima Annunziata in Pistoia, continuing a series begun in 1601 by Bernardino Poccetti. He painted a frieze depicting children’s Games and stories from Orlando Furioso (c. 1631) for Villa Corsini a Mezzomonte in Impruneta.

He was commissioned to decorate the library in the Casa Buonarroti of Florence. After his depiction of Fame on the ceiling of the library, he became disenchanted with the patron’s excessive instructions, and the panels of illustrious Florentines on the walls were completed by others, including Domenico Puligo and Matteo Rosselli (1636). He was commissioned to complete work initiated by Giovanni da San Giovanni (who died after starting) for the Sala degli Argenti in  Palazzo Pitti, in a commission shared with Ottavio Vannini and Francesco Furini. The frescoes, intended to celebrate Lorenzo de' Medici, were commissioned in 1635 by Ferdinando II de' Medici prior to his marriage to the daughter of the Duke of Urbino. In the south wall, Bravo completed Lorenzo as messenger of peace.

Bravo was part of a team that frescoed quadri riportati on the walls of the Oratorio dei Vanchetoni. The oratory also contains frescoes by San Giovanni, Pietro Liberi and Baldassare Franceschini (il Volterrano). A canvas by Bravo of the Aurora, a theme also depicted earlier by Guido Reni, is at the Palazzo Montecitorio.

In 1659, Cecco was recommended by the Cardinal Leopoldo de' Medici for a position as a court painter to Anna, wife of the archduke of Ferdinand Karl of the Tyrol. He accepted and spent the last two years of his life in Innsbruck. One of his patrons was Filippo Baldinucci, but Bravo was not included in his biographies of Florentine artists.

Howard Hibbard contrasted the murky sensuality of the paintings of Pignoni, Furini and Bravo with the piety of Carlo Dolci. Bravo is one of the few Florentines to violate the crisp drawn edges of figures, and aim for a general bravura of execution, nearly becoming a pintore del tocco. Some attribute this to influences he encountered in Venice, for example Bernardo Strozzi. Cecco Bravo influenced Felice Ficherelli (il Riposo).

References

Bibliography

External links

1601 births
1661 deaths
17th-century Italian painters
Italian male painters
Painters from Florence
Italian Baroque painters